West Elwood is an unincorporated community in Madison and Tipton counties, in the U.S. state of Indiana.

It is part of the Kokomo, Indiana, Metropolitan Statistical Area.

Geography

References

Unincorporated communities in Tipton County, Indiana
Unincorporated communities in Indiana
Kokomo, Indiana metropolitan area